Arlington Village Historic District may refer to:

 Arlington Village Historic District (Arlington, Virginia), List of RHPs in VA|listed on the NRHP in Virginia
 Arlington Village Historic District (Arlington, Vermont), listed on the NRHP in Vermont
 East Arlington Village Historic District, Arlington, Vermont, listed on the NRHP in Vermont